Garuk-e Bala (also Romanized as Garūk-e Bālā; also known as Garak-e Bālā, Garok-e Bālā, and Garūk-e ‘Olyā) is a village in Kangan Rural District, in the Central District of Jask County, Hormozgan Province, Iran. At the 2006 census, its population was 211, in 42 families.

References 

Populated places in Jask County